Daniel James McQuaid (born October 4, 1960) is a former American football offensive tackle in the National Football League for the Washington Redskins, Indianapolis Colts, and the Minnesota Vikings.  He played college football at the University of Nevada, Las Vegas.

1960 births
Living people
Sportspeople from California
American football offensive tackles
Washington Redskins players
Indianapolis Colts players
Minnesota Vikings players